Henry Charles Pratt (17611838) was born in Philadelphia, Pennsylvania, on May 14, 1761, one of six children born to Matthew Pratt (1734–1805) and Elizabeth Moore (1739–1777).

Career
He was a successful merchant-trader and real estate developer. 
He began his career as a merchant-trader after the American Revolutionary War.  In 1780 he travelled to the West Indies. From there, he imported flour and timber, and exported molasses, coffee, wine and gin.

Marriage and Children
He was married in 1778 to Frances Moore (b.    d. 1785).  They had four children: Thomas H. Pratt, (September 18, 1779 – June 18, 1812); Elizabeth Pratt Kugler, (May 24, 1781); Henry Pratt, (November 18, 1782 – July 13, 1784); and, Frances Henrietta, (August 25, 1784 – July 17, 1785). 
 
He then married Elizabeth Dundas on October 27, 1785.  They had six children:  Mary Ann, (August 3, 1786 – August 18, 1786); Anna Marie Dundas, (September 15, 1787); James Dundas Pratt, (April 23, 1789); Henry Pratt, (October 15, 1790); Sarah Clementina McKean, (December 1, 1791); and, Henry (September 13, 1793 – September 26, 1793).  Elizabeth died in her 29th year.

In 1794 he married his third wife, Susannah Care; she was 18 years old and he 33.  They had four children: Edmond Pratt, (February 15, 1797); Henry Pratt, (December 6, 1798); Charles Moore Pratt, (July 7, 1800); and, Amanda Pratt, (April 21, 1802). Susannah died in 1816 at 40 years old.

In total he had 14 children; of which only two outlived him.

Lemon Hill Estate
In 1799 Pratt purchased the 43 acres at a Sheriff's sale for $14,654.  Originally part of Robert Morris' 300-acre estate "The Hills".  Pratt designed the house himself and served as general contractor.  Pratt named the estate Lemon Hill after the many lemon trees he found in Morris' greenhouse.  He maintained the house and gardens as his showplace until he sold it in 1836, two years before his death. Lemon Hill then had a succession of individual owners until 1844, when it was purchased by the City of Philadelphia.

Death
He died on February 6, 1838, in Philadelphia, Pennsylvania.  He is buried in Christ Church Burial Ground.

References

1761 births
1838 deaths
Businesspeople from Philadelphia
People of colonial Pennsylvania
18th-century American businesspeople
Burials at Christ Church, Philadelphia
Colonial American merchants